Patric "Pim" Håkansson (born 26 August 1977 in Karlstad; also known as Patric Klaremo) is a Swedish curler and curling coach.

Teams

Record as a coach of national teams

Personal life

References

External links
 
 
 

Living people
1977 births
Sportspeople from Karlstad
Swedish male curlers
Swedish curling coaches
20th-century Swedish people